Elwood Neal Veitch (July 21, 1929 – September 18, 1993) was a financial administrator and political figure in British Columbia. He represented Burnaby-Willingdon in the Legislative Assembly of British Columbia from 1975 to 1978 and from 1983 to 1991 as a Social Credit member.

Veitch was born in Monck Township, Ontario, the son of Wellington Veitch and Alice Alma Brott, and was educated in Bracebridge, Ajax and at the University of British Columbia. In 1953, he married Sheila Gertrude Boyce. Veitch served in the provincial cabinet as Minister of Finance and Corporate Relations, Minister of Regional Development, Minister of Consumer and Corporate Affairs and Provincial Secretary. He died in 1993 at the age of 64.

References 

1929 births
1993 deaths
British Columbia Social Credit Party MLAs
Canadian financial businesspeople
Finance ministers of British Columbia
Members of the Executive Council of British Columbia
People from Wellington County, Ontario
University of British Columbia alumni